Misia Remix 2002 World Peace is Misia's third remix album, released on November 21, 2001. It sold 165,190 in its first week and peaked at #3. Misia Remix 2002 World Peace features Erick Morillo's first remix for a Japanese artist.

Track listing

Charts

Oricon Sales Chart

Physical sales charts

References

External links
Sony Music Online Japan : MISIA

Misia albums
2001 remix albums
Arista Records remix albums